Paw Paw Township may refer to the following places in the United States:

 Paw Paw Township, DeKalb County, Illinois
 Paw Paw Township, Wabash County, Indiana
 Paw Paw Township, Elk County, Kansas
 Paw Paw Township, Michigan